This is a list of lighthouses and lightvessels in Belgium.

Lighthouses

See also
 Lists of lighthouses and lightvessels

References

External links

 

Lighthouses
Transport in Belgium
Belgium
Lighthouses